Jennifer Lyn Marcroft (born 1963) is a New Zealand politician and former Member of Parliament in the House of Representatives for the New Zealand First party.

Early life
Both Marcroft's parents died during her childhood leaving her an orphan at 16. She then lived with a violent step-father in Rotorua who motivated her to run away from home. She is part Māori on her father's side and identifies as Ngāpuhi. Marcroft's mother was a family friend of former Deputy-Prime Minister Don McKinnon, who supported her entry into politics.

Broadcasting career
Marcroft had a career spanning over 30 years in the broadcasting industry, mostly reading the news on the radio for Independent Radio News, however she also read the news on television for TV3 at times. During her career she worked to ensure her pronunciation of Māori names was correct, receiving criticism for doing so. During the 1990s as a newsreader she was told not to say "kia ora" at the beginning of bulletins, but decided to persist anyway.

Political career

Member of parliament

In  Marcroft stood for New Zealand First in the  electorate and was placed ninth on New Zealand First's party list. She duly entered parliament via the party list.

Following the formation of a Labour-led coalition government on 19 October 2019, Marcroft was designated as New Zealand First's spokesperson on the Accident Compensation Corporation (ACC), arts, culture and heritage, broadcasting, communication IT, conservation, environment, health and human rights. On 15 November 2017, she was appointed to Parliament's environment select committee. On 24 October 2018, Marcroft was appointed to Parliament's health select committee. On 30 June 2019, Marcroft was appointed to the Parliamentary Service Commission's artworks committee.

On 23 October 2019, Marcroft successfully secured an amendment into David Seymour's End of Life Choice Bill that the Government hold a binding referendum on decriminalising euthanasia. In justifying her call for a referendum on euthanasia, Marcroft stated that "this issue basically, directly affects the fabric of society and so we believe that temporarily empowered politicians … we alone should not decide on the bill." Parliament voted by a tight margin of 63 to 57 to incorporate the referendum amendment into the Bill.

During the 2020 general election held on 17 October, Marcroft contested the Auckland Central electorate, coming sixth place. She and her fellow NZ First MPs also lost their seats after the party's vote dropped to 2.6%, below the five percent threshold needed to enter Parliament.

Post-parliament
In late January 2021, Marcroft along with fellow former MP Tracey Martin left New Zealand First, expressing skepticism that the party would be able to contest the next general election and opining that the party needed to rebuild and return to its roots. She then subsequently joined the Labour Party. By October 2022 Marcroft was involved with New Zealand First again and was an attendant at the party's annual conference in Christchurch.

Following the 2022 Auckland mayoral election, incoming Auckland Mayor Wayne Brown hired Marcroft as an advisor.

References

Living people
1963 births
New Zealand First MPs
Members of the New Zealand House of Representatives
New Zealand list MPs
Candidates in the 2017 New Zealand general election
Unsuccessful candidates in the 2020 New Zealand general election
New Zealand radio presenters
Ngāpuhi people
Māori MPs
New Zealand women radio presenters